The Corrections Exemplary Service Medal is a Canadian service medal for correctional officers and employees.

It is, within the Canadian system of honours, the second highest of the exemplary service medals.

To qualify for this medal the recipient has to meet the following criteria:

 20 years of full-time (but not necessarily consecutive) service in a Canadian correctional service.
 10 years service as a peace officer in a correctional facility, as a probation officer, as a parole officer, or in another position that brought the recipient into contact with offenders on a regular basis.
 Has not received another decoration from the Crown for this service.
 Has, during the 20 years of service, conducted themselves in an exemplary manner, characterized by good conduct, industry and efficiency.

Appearance
The Corrections Exemplary Service Medal is circular, made of silver coloured metal,  in diameter. The obverse of the medal depicts a maple leaf with a crossed torch and key superimposed upon the centre. Circumscribed around the medal are the words Exemplary Service – Services Distingués. The areas between the edge of the medal and the maple leaf are cut out. The reverse depicts the crowned cypher of the monarch. The recipient's name is engraved on the edge of the medal.

The medal is suspended by a stylized inverted fleur-de-lis on a straight suspension bar.

Each additional 10-year period of full-time service may qualify recipients for award of a bar to the medal. The bar is silver and bears a stylized maple leaf.  When only wearing the ribbon bar, a small silver maple leaf is worn to represent award of the bar.

References

External links

Civil awards and decorations of Canada
Prison officer awards
1984 establishments in Canada
Penal system in Canada
Awards established in 1984
Long and Meritorious Service Medals of Britain and the Commonwealth